David N. Titcher is a screenwriter and producer. He is best known as the creator of The Librarian (franchise) writer of The Librarian: Quest for the Spear, The Curse of King Tut's Tomb, The Librarian: Return to King Solomon's Mines, Around the World in 80 Days, Morgan Stewart's Coming Home, The Librarian: Curse of the Judas Chalice and Houdini & Doyle.

He is also known for his producing credits serving as Executive Producer of Fox Network's "Houdini & Doyle,", Co-Producer of The Librarian: Quest for the Spear as well as a Consulting Producer on the TV Series adaptation of The Librarian Franchise, "The Librarians (2014 TV series)", and Co-Executive Producer on the Hallmark Channel's "Be My Valentine".

Notes

External links

Living people
American male screenwriters
Year of birth missing (living people)